Transformers: Rise of the Dark Spark is a video game based on the Transformers franchise, developed by Edge of Reality and WayForward, and published by Activision. It is the third and final entry in the Cybertron series, following War for Cybertron and Fall of Cybertron, and acts as a spin-off and crossover with the live-action Transformers films. One portion of the game takes place in the timeline divergent from the one where the films take place, serving as an alternative to the events of Age of Extinction, and follows the Autobots as they try to retrieve a Cybertronian artifact called the Dark Spark from the mercenary Lockdown. The other portion, set between the first two Cybertron games, depicts the Decepticons' attempts to use the Dark Spark to win the war against the Autobots, and the latter's efforts to stop them.

The game was developed primarily by Edge of Reality, with the Nintendo 3DS version developed by WayForward Technologies. It was published by Activision and released worldwide in June 2014 for Microsoft Windows, Nintendo 3DS, PlayStation 3, PlayStation 4, Wii U, Xbox 360, and Xbox One. Rise of the Dark Spark received mixed-to-negative reviews.

Gameplay
The console and Microsoft Windows versions of Transformers: Rise of the Dark Spark are a third-person shooter, much like its predecessors: Transformers: War for Cybertron, Transformers: Fall of Cybertron, and Transformers: Dark of the Moon. Players can control each transformer in both its robot and vehicle forms. Instead of a traditional health system, the game features a system similar to the Halo series of video games. The player character has both a regenerating shield and health, the latter of which can be replenished by a health pack. The game features various challenges which reward the players with weapon upgrades, characters for the multiplayer component, and other bonuses. Upgrades for weapons can be purchased through Teletran 1 kiosks found throughout the game. Every character has their own unique ability. For example, Soundwave can summon his minions, Optimus Prime has a shield to block incoming fire, Sharpshot can turn invisible for a few seconds, and the Combaticons have the ability to combine into the massive Decepticon Bruticus. The Autobot Grimlock, who transforms into a dinosaur, is controlled differently from other characters: he carries only melee weapons (though he can shoot fire out of his mouth when in dinosaur form), and is much larger than other characters, in addition to having more health points.

The 3DS version of the game is a strategy game role-playing video game. Melee combat is turn-based. The player is given three rounds to deplete their opponent's health. If successful, the enemy is removed from the overworld map. The player can choose from seven different attacks, each with their own recharge time after each use.

Multiplayer 
Transformers: Rise of The Dark Spark has an extra mode called "Escalation". It is an online multiplayer mode where four players fend off waves of increasingly tough enemies, returned with the addition of upgradable defenses. The mode features over forty playable characters, and has levels based on both Cybertron and Earth.  Experience points collected by players are shared between the single-player and multiplayer modes. The Escalation mode is absent in the Wii U and 3DS versions of the game.

Synopsis

Setting
Transformers: Rise of the Dark Spark is a crossover with the Transformers film franchise and the Cybertron video game series, the latter consisting of Transformers: War for Cybertron and Transformers: Fall of Cybertron. The eponymous Dark Spark is a powerful artifact that is capable of ripping holes in dimensions, which brings two Transformers universes together. The Cybertron universe component of the game takes place before the events of Fall of Cybertron, while its film series universe component takes place on Earth in 2014, continuing Transformers: Dark of the Moon and ignoring Transformers: Age of Extinction. The story consists of fourteen chapters, six of which are set on Earth and eight on Cybertron.

Characters 

Playable in campaignPlayable in escalationAppears in campaign, but is non-playableSlag was renamed Slug in the game due to Slag being a derogatory term in some culturesOriginally available via pre-order, later downloadable content

Plot
On Earth, in the film continuity, the Autobots Optimus Prime, Bumblebee, and Drift investigate the site of a mysterious crash in an abandoned city, encountering a large group of Cybertronian mercenaries led by Lockdown. At the crash site, they find a Cybertronian relic known as the Dark Spark, but before they can retrieve it, Lockdown takes it for himself and uses it to temporarily freeze them in time. As Lockdown makes his escape, Optimus says "I thought this day would never come..." and proceeds explain what the Dark Spark is: a powerful relic of unknown origins, believed to be the antithesis of the Autobot Matrix of Leadership. Whereas the Matrix grants wisdom, the Dark Spark gives the user the power to bend the universe and its inhabitants to their own will.

In the Cybertron continuity, Megatron announces that the Decepticons are close to defeating the Autobots and conquering Cybertron, and dispatches Starscream, Soundwave, and Shockwave to find the Dark Spark in the abandoned Crystal City. During their search, the Decepticons are attacked by a swarm of Insecticons led by Hardshell, Kickback and Sharpshot. Shockwave defeats the trio, earning their fealty and control of the Insecticons. With their help, the Decepticons find the Dark Spark, but before they can retrieve it, the Autobots Sideswipe and Ironhide grab it and run away. Pursued by Insecticons, they regroup with Optimus and Bumblebee at a train station, where they must fight off hordes of Insecticons and Starscream until the next train arrives. The Autobots manage to escape, but Shockwave destroys the train using hidden explosives.

Shockwave and Sharpshot defeat Ironhide to reclaim the Dark Spark, but while attempting to reunite with the other Decepticons, they are ambushed by the Autobots. After escaping from them, the pair meet up with the Combaticons Onslaught, Vortex, and Swindle, the latter of whom helps them safely deliver the Dark Spark to Kaon, the Decepticons' capital city. Along the way, they are again ambushed by the Autobots, including Cliffjumper, but manage to defeat them. Jazz subsequently leads an Autobot siege on the gates of Kaon, but the Combaticons combine to form Bruticus and repel the attack. Cliffjumper is taken prisoner after unsuccessfully trying to destroy Bruticus with an explosive.

Optimus and Jazz lead a secret mission to retrieve the Dark Spark and rescue Cliffjumper, but after finding the latter, all three become caught in a virtually inescapable trap. Optimus contacts Perceptor, who sends Jetfire to infiltrate the ruins of the massive Decepticon Trypticon. Despite an encounter with a Decepticon salvage team led by Starscream, Jetfire is able to use Trypticon's laser array to free Optimus, Jazz, and Cliffjumper, and then escape. While Jazz escorts the wounded Cliffjumper to safety, Optimus confronts Megatron, who uses the Dark Spark in combination with Dark Energon to revive several dead Autobots as mindless drones. Optimus defeats Megatron and uses the Matrix of Leadership to send the Dark Spark into deep space, but this injures both of them. While Shockwave carries Megatron away to safety, Optimus contacts Jazz to tell him that the Dark Spark is gone and they can advance with their plan to leave Cybertron via the Ark.

Back in the film continuity, the Autobots track Lockdown to a jungle, with Bumblebee and Drift being sent to scout ahead and find the mercenaries' stronghold. After Drift is captured, Bumblebee rescues him, but the pair are soon overwhelmed by enemy forces. They are saved by the sudden appearance of Grimlock, who helps them defeat the mercenaries, though Lockdown escapes once again. After learning Lockdown is heading to an underground military base in another abandoned city, the Autobots go there to confront him, but only Optimus, Bumblebee, and Drift enter the bunker, as Grimlock is forced to stay behind to defend the entrance. The trio discover Lockdown is building a Time Bridge to bring the Autobot-Decepticon war into the present for personal gain, but the Autobots destroy it while Optimus confronts Lockdown. With Drift's help, Optimus separates Lockdown from the Dark Spark and throws the latter into the Time Bridge, sending it to an unknown point in time. The Autobots and Lockdown escape moments before the Time Bridge explodes, vowing to meet again.

In an epilogue scene, the G1 continuity Optimus sees the Dark Spark crashing on Earth and also says "I thought this day would never come..."

Development
The Windows and console versions of Transformers: Rise of the Dark Spark are powered by Epic Games' Unreal Engine 3 and utilize the Havok physics engine. Unlike Fall of Cybertron and War for Cybertron, which were developed by High Moon Studios, primary development for Rise of the Dark Spark was handled by Edge of Reality. WayForward Technologies developed the Nintendo 3DS version of the game, which unlike its counterparts is a strategy RPG. It is the first PlayStation 4 game to use its Pre-Load feature, which allows players to download a game before its release date and have it ready to play the day it is released.  Owing to the nature of the game's narrative several characters have multiple models to choose from, each related to a given continuity. For example, Autobots Bumblebee and Grimlock feature two separate playable character models, one from the War for Cybertron continuity, and one from the cinematic universe. Optimus Prime features two separate character models from these continuities, plus a Transformers: Generation 1 model.

Several veteran voice actors voice multiple characters. Peter Cullen reprises his long-time role as Optimus Prime. Of his experience provided voice work for the game, Cullen said "there was a such a respect for the character from the beginning. I wasn’t used to that, it’s something that’s transformed—pardon the pun—over the years." Fred Tatasciore also returns to voice Megatron. Jim Ward voices Perceptor, Scott Whyte voices Hardshell, and Travis Willingham voices Onslaught and Sideswipe. Troy Baker voices Jazz, Jetfire, and Kickback. Gregg Berger voices Grimlock and Lockdown while Steve Blum provides the voices for Sharpshot, Shockwave, and Swindle. Nolan North, voices Bruticus and Cliffjumper and Keith Silverstein voices Blast Off and Rumble. Soundwave is voiced by Isaac C. Singleton Jr. A trailer for Rise of the Dark Spark featured American rock band Linkin Park's second single "Until It's Gone".

The game was released in 2014 for Microsoft Windows, Nintendo 3DS, PlayStation 3, PlayStation 4, Wii U, Xbox 360, and Xbox One in North America on June 24, in Australia on June 25, and in Europe on June 27.

As of 2020, Activision has discontinued support for Rise of the Dark Spark, and the game's multiplayer servers have been shut down.

Reception

The console and Windows versions of Transformers: Rise of the Dark Spark, developed by Edge of Reality, received unfavourable reviews from critics. Approval ratings for this version averaged between 60.00% and 30.00% at GameRankings, while Metacritic reports scores in the 40s. IGN gave it a "bad" rating of 4.0 out of 10.0, due to "interesting" and "colorful" design, a "complex" story, and the total absence of multiplayer support on Wii U.  The Nintendo 3DS version, developed by WayForward Technologies, received  better reviews with a GameRankings score of 60.00% and no Metacritic score reported.

References

External links

2014 video games
Activision games
Nintendo 3DS games
Nintendo 3DS eShop games
PlayStation 3 games
PlayStation 4 games
Third-person shooters
Rise of the Dark Spark
Unreal Engine games
Video games scored by Steve Jablonsky
Video games scored by Troels Brun Folmann
Video games set in the United States
Video games set in the future
Video games set on fictional planets
Video games about parallel universes
Video games with alternative versions
Wii U games
Wii U eShop games
Windows games
Xbox 360 games
Xbox One games
Multiplayer and single-player video games
WayForward games
Video games developed in the United States